Henry Loubscher (born 9 August 1936 in Germiston) is a former boxer from South Africa, bronze medalist at the 1956 Summer Olympics in Melbourne.

References

1936 births
Sportspeople from Germiston
Olympic boxers of South Africa
Olympic bronze medalists for South Africa
Boxers at the 1956 Summer Olympics
Boxers at the 1960 Summer Olympics
Living people
Olympic medalists in boxing
Medalists at the 1956 Summer Olympics
Boxers at the 1958 British Empire and Commonwealth Games
Commonwealth Games gold medallists for South Africa
South African male boxers
Commonwealth Games medallists in boxing
Light-welterweight boxers
Medallists at the 1958 British Empire and Commonwealth Games